Avalon is a historic home located near New Windsor, Carroll County, Maryland.  It is a -story, early-19th-century brick house constructed c.  1814, and reflecting the influence of Neoclassical architecture.

It was listed on the National Register of Historic Places in 1987.

References

External links
, including photo in 2006, at Maryland Historical Trust

Houses on the National Register of Historic Places in Maryland
Houses in Carroll County, Maryland
New Windsor, Maryland
National Register of Historic Places in Carroll County, Maryland